Visnagar is a city and a municipality in Mehsana district in the Indian state of Gujarat. Visnagar is also a taluka capital.

History
"Visnagar" named after its founder king Visaladev from Ajmer Dynasty was founded in 953 on the auspicious day of 'Akhatrij'.

Founded just as an outpost of the kingdom of king Visaldeo surrounding the present 'Deliya Talao' a huge water tank covering an area of approx 2 lac sq. meter.
As it was falling on a very strategic geographical location, Visnagar faced many war fights between Visaldeo, Babis, Ider dynasty and Gayakwads with change of rulers Visnagar so many changes and it grew with a fort wall with 6 gates none of them is present at this time but at some places, remains can be seen.

Visnagar Kasba Under Gayakwad rule, Visnagar become the first town in North Gujarat to have an underground water supply and sewerage system, Railway was also brought glory with it for the development of Visnagar with electricity.

Visnagar produced many freedom fighters during the time of the British Rule. Noted teachers, painters, drama artists, writers were also among those who highlighted Visnagar.

Visnagar City Industrial establishments like submersible pumps, thrashers, diamonds, and copper vessels drew attention nationwide. Industrial development, real estate development, education facilities, and medical facilities attract people from surrounding villages to come and stay here.

The city has a library named Parekh Vallabh Hemchand General Library, which is one of the oldest libraries of Gujarat. The library was established on 3rd March of 1878.

Geography

Earlier Visnagar was known as "Copper City" because there were so many workers who used to make pots from copper. It also has a big garden called "Doshabhai Garden". It is considered one of the major commercial centers of the Mehsana district. Visnagar is surround by many great places with religious and architectural importance like Ambaji (96 km), Becharaji (63 km), unjha (24 km), Mahudi (34 km), Patan (52 km), Modhera (44 km), Taranga (50 km) and Vadnagar. some of the best attractive places to visit near visnagar are Tirupati natural & Water park (8  km), Bliss Aqua world (27  km), Sankus water park & Resort (39  km), Tirupati Rushivan Adventure park (34  km). Visnagar is 20 km away from Mehsana Railway station and the nearest airport is at Ahmedabad (80  km)

Demographics
 India census, Visnagar had a population of 68,826. Males constitute 53% of the population and females 47%. Visnagar has an average literacy rate of 77%, male literacy is 82%, and female literacy is 71%.

Education

Schools 
 Adarsh Vidhyalay, Visnagar
D.D.parikh kanya vidhyalay
 G.D.High School, Visnagar
 Kanya Sala, Visnagar
 Modern English School, Visnagar
 N.M. Nootan Sarva Vidyalaya, Visnagar
 Navyug Shisuniketan, Visnagar
 Prakash Vidyalaya, Visnagar
 Sardar Patel High School, Visnagar
 School of Victors, Visnagar
 School of Achievers
 Shri Sahajanand School, Visnagar
 Gurukul School, Visnagar
 Galaxy
 Iqra High School

Universities 
 Sankalchand Patel University
M N collage of science and arts

Hospitals
 G D General Hospital 
Gokul orthopedic hospital
 Aakash Eye Hospital
 Sanjeevani Hospital
 Siddhivinayak Hospital
 MIMS Hospital
 Himani Hospital
 Sardar Patel Hospital
 Jyoti Nursing Home
 Upasna Hospital
 Narsinhbhai Patel Dental College & Hospital
 Vatsal Children Hospital and Jugal neonatal nursery 
 Ridham Hospital for Women
 Amee Hospital
 Krishna Hospital
 Narsinhbhai Patel Medical College & Hospital

Villages of Visnagar Taluka
 Bakarpur
 Basana
 Becharpura
 Bhalak
 Bhandu
 Bokarvada
 Chhogala
 Chitroda Mota
 Chitrodipura
 Dadhiyal
 Denap
 Dhamanva
 Dharusana
 Ganpatpura
 Ghaghret
 Gothva
 Gunja
 Gunjala
 Hasanpur
 Iyasara
 Kada
 Kajialiyasana
 Kamalpur
 Kankupura
 Kamana
 Kansa
 Kansarakui
 Khadalpur
 Khandosan
 Kharvada
 Kiyadar
 Kuvasana
 Lachhadi
 Laxmipura
 Magroda
 Mahamadpur
 Megha Aliyasana
 Paldi
 Pudgam
 Rajgadh
 Ralisana
 Rampura
 Randala
 Rangakui
 Rangpur
 Ravalapura
 Saduthala
 Satusana
 Savala
 Sunshi
 Tarabh
 Thalota
 Thumthal
 Udalpur
 Umta
 Vadu
 Valam
 Visnagar

References

 Cities and towns in Mehsana district